Makenna Goodman is an American editor and author.

Early life and career 
Goodman grew up in Colorado. After attending college, she lived in New York, where she wrote for art magazines and reviewed films before getting a job as an editorial assistant at a Big Five publisher. After working in that position for a year, she worked for a literary agent for less than a year before being fired. She subsequently moved to Vermont in 2008 because she disliked the field of corporate publishing and wanted to be a writer.

After arriving in Vermont, Goodman intended to work at a diner but reached out to a small press in the area even though there were no job openings available. The press hired her, and she worked as an editor at the radical and mission-based organization for 11 years. Much of her work at the publisher was centered around books about agriculture and Integrative Health, which paralleled her efforts to grow her own food at home.

Goodman is married and has multiple children. , she lived in Vershire, Vermont.

The Shame 
Goodman's debut novel is titled The Shame. She wrote it in secret, only telling her husband Sam and her agent about it after completing the first draft, which she wrote around 2015 after reading a book about psychoanalytic theory; she was particularly inspired by the book's analysis of Eros and Psyche. The book's title was suggested by Goodman's friend Sheila Heti. It was published by Milkweed Editions.

References

External links
Author website

Living people
21st-century American novelists
21st-century American women writers
People from Vershire, Vermont
Year of birth missing (living people)